Michael Mahood (born November 11, 1975 in North Vancouver, British Columbia) is a retired field hockey goalkeeper from Canada, who earned his first international senior cap for the Men's National Team in 1995 against India in Italy.  He went on to appear in 196 international matches including two Olympic Games (Sydney 2000, Beijing 2008) and the 1998 World Cup in Utrecht, Holland.  In 1999 he was named to the World XI as part of the FIH 75th Anniversary celebrations in Alexandria, Egypt.

In his retirement Mahood has become men's tailor in Vancouver, BC.

Mike attended Handsworth Secondary School.

International senior competitions
 1996 — World Cup Preliminary, Sardinia (2nd)
 1997 — World Cup Qualifier, Kuala Lumpur (5th)
 1998 — World Cup, Utrecht (8th)
 1998 — Commonwealth Games, Kuala Lumpur (not ranked)
 1999 — Sultan Azlan Shah Tournament, Kuala Lumpur (4th)
 1999 — Pan American Games, Winnipeg (1st)
 2000 — Sultan Azlan Shah Tournament, Kuala Lumpur (7th)
 2000 — Americas Cup, Cuba (2nd)
 2000 — Olympic Games, Sydney (10th)
 2001 — World Cup Qualifier, Edinburgh (8th)
 2002 — Commonwealth Games, Manchester (6th)
 2003 — Pan American Games, Santo Domingo (2nd)
 2004 — Olympic Qualifying Tournament, Madrid (11th)
 2004 — Pan Am Cup, London (2nd)
 2006 — Commonwealth Games, Melbourne (9th)
 2007 — Pan American Games, Rio de Janeiro (1st)
 2008 — Olympic Games, Beijing (10th)

References

External links

 Mike Mahood's Field Hockey Profile

1975 births
Living people
Sportspeople from British Columbia
Canadian male field hockey players
Canadian people of Ulster-Scottish descent
Field hockey players at the 1998 Commonwealth Games
Field hockey players at the 2000 Summer Olympics
Field hockey players at the 2002 Commonwealth Games
Field hockey players at the 2006 Commonwealth Games
Field hockey players at the 2007 Pan American Games
Field hockey players at the 2008 Summer Olympics
Commonwealth Games competitors for Canada
Olympic field hockey players of Canada
People from North Vancouver
Pan American Games gold medalists for Canada
Pan American Games silver medalists for Canada
Pan American Games medalists in field hockey
1998 Men's Hockey World Cup players
Medalists at the 2007 Pan American Games